Arthaz-Pont-Notre-Dame is a commune in the Haute-Savoie department in the Auvergne-Rhône-Alpes region in south-eastern France.  It was formed by merging two small settlements in 1813.

Population

See also
Communes of the Haute-Savoie department

References

Communes of Haute-Savoie